Perrie is both a surname and given name, and may refer to:

Surname
 Ian Perrie (born 1979), Australian rules footballer
 Lynne Perrie (1931–2006), English actress
 Maureen Perrie (born 1946), lecturer in Russian History

Given name
 Perrie Mans (born 1940), retired professional snooker player
 Perrie Edwards (born 1993), English singer

See also

 Pari (disambiguation)
 Peary (disambiguation)
 John Perie
 Perry (disambiguation)
 Pery
 Perrie Award